There have been two baronetcies created for persons with the surname Bates, both in the Baronetage of the United Kingdom. As of 2014 both creations are extant.

The Bates Baronetcy, of Bellefield in the County Palatine of Lancaster, was created in the Baronetage of the United Kingdom on 13 May 1880 for Edward Bates, Conservative Member of Parliament for Plymouth. The second baronet was appointed Sheriff of Flintshire for 1899. The fourth Baronet was Chairman of the Cunard Steam Ship Company and High Sheriff of Cheshire in 1920. The fifth Baronet was High Sheriff of Flintshire in 1969 and was decorated with an MC in 1942. As of 2014 the title is held by his great-grandson, the seventh Baronet, who succeeded his uncle in 2002.

The family seat is Gyrn Castle, near Holywell, Clwyd.

The Bates Baronetcy, of Magherabuoy in the County of Londonderry, was created in the Baronetage of the United Kingdom on 7 June 1937 for the Northern Irish politician Dawson Bates. He was Minister of Home Affairs for Northern Ireland from 1921 to 1943. As of 2014 the title is held by his grandson, the third Baronet, who succeeded his father in 1998.

The family seat was Magherabuoy House, near Portrush, County Antrim.

Bates baronets, of Bellefield (1880)
Sir Edward Bates, 1st Baronet (1816–1896)
Sir Edward Percy Bates, 2nd Baronet (1845–1899)
Sir Edward Bertram Bates, 3rd Baronet (1877–1903)
Sir Percy Elly Bates, 4th Baronet (1879–1946)
Sir Geoffrey Voltelin Bates, 5th Baronet (1921–2005)
Sir Richard Geoffrey Bates, 6th Baronet (1946–2002)
Sir James Geoffrey Bates, 7th Baronet (b. 1985)

The heir presumptive is the present holder's second cousin once-removed Hugh Percy Bates (b. 1953).
The heir presumptive's heir apparent is his son James Edward Bates (b. 1994).

Bates baronets, of Magherabuoy (1937)
Sir (Richard) Dawson Bates, 1st Baronet (1876–1949)
Sir (John) Dawson Bates, 2nd Baronet (1921–1998)
Sir Richard Dawson Hoult Bates, 3rd Baronet (b. 1956)

The heir presumptive is the present holder's brother Charles Joseph Dill Bates (b. 1959).
The heir presumptive's heir apparent is his son Patrick Charles Beaumont Bates (b. 1990).

Notes

References
Kidd, Charles, Williamson, David (editors). Debrett's Peerage and Baronetage (1990 edition). New York: St Martin's Press, 1990, 

Bates